Jimmy Reed Plays 12 String Guitar Blues is an album by blues musician Jimmy Reed recorded in Chicago in 1963 and released by the Vee-Jay label.

Reception

AllMusic reviewer Bruce Eder stated: "Jimmy Reed -- not a celebrated 12-string guitar player like Leadbelly or any of the other renowned instrumentalists who came up in Leadbelly's wake -- cut this acoustic 12-string instrumental album, which has become an enduring classic of the genre. Reed was as skilled at presenting his guitar work as he was as a singer ... Consisting of recognizable Reed originals and a couple of other blues standards thrown in, the music comes off very well, mixing electric guitar with acoustic 12-string and Reed's harmonica substituting for the vocal parts ... The result is yet another classic album by Reed, and one of the more straightfoward and accessible bodies of blues played on 12-string that one can find". The Penguin Guide to Blues Recordings suggests that it is not, in fact, Reed who plays the 12-string guitar on this album.

Track listing 
All compositions by Jimmy Reed except where noted
 "Bright Lights, Big City" – 2:29
 "St. Louis Blues" (W. C. Handy) – 2:27
 "Blue Carnegie" – 2:08
 "New Chicago Blues" – 2:19
 "Big Boss Man" (Luther Dixon, Al Smith) – 2:50
 "Hush Hush" – 2:27
 "Blues for Twelve Strings" – 1:40
 "Baby, What You Want Me to Do" – 2:27
 "Boogie in the Dark" – 2:37
 "Take Out Some Insurance" (Charles Singleton, Waldense Hall) – 2:24
 "Aw Shucks, Hush Your Mouth" – 2:23
 "Close Together" – 2:24

Personnel 
Jimmy Reed – 12-string guitar, guitar, harmonica
Lefty Bates, Eddie Taylor – guitar
Marcus "Benjy" Johnson	– bass
Earl Phillips, Morris Wilkerson – drums
Mary Lee Reed – vocals
Technical
George Whiteman - cover photography, design

References 

Jimmy Reed albums
1963 albums
Vee-Jay Records albums